The Haslam Formation is a black shale geologic formation exposed on Vancouver Island and the Gulf Islands, British Columbia, Canada. It preserves primarily marine fossils dating back to the Santonian Epoch of the Cretaceous period.

See also

 List of fossiliferous stratigraphic units in British Columbia

References
 

Cretaceous British Columbia